Dublin South-East was a parliamentary constituency represented in Dáil Éireann, the lower house of the Irish parliament or Oireachtas, from 1948 to 2016. The method of election was proportional representation by means of the single transferable vote (PR-STV).

Boundaries
The constituency was created under the Electoral (Amendment) Act 1947 and first used at the 1948 general election. It substantially succeeded the previous constituency of Dublin Townships. It included areas such as Ballsbridge, Donnybrook, Harolds Cross, Sandymount, Ranelagh, Rathmines, Ringsend and the central business district of the city (including Trinity College Dublin and St Stephen's Green).

Constituency profile
By geographical area, Dublin South-East was the smallest constituency in the country. It had a diverse socio-economic profile and a large transient population which was reflected in the turnout: the constituency had one of the lowest turnouts in the country in 2007 and 2011.

Notable Dublin South-East TDs include former Taoisigh John A. Costello and Garret FitzGerald, the former leader of the Progressive Democrats Michael McDowell, maverick left-wing politician Noël Browne and former Minister for Finance Ruairi Quinn (who has the distinction of being its longest-serving, first elected in 1977 and continuously elected from February 1982 until his retirement in 2016). The former President of Ireland, Mary McAleese, unsuccessfully contested the constituency for Fianna Fáil in 1987.

The 'Rumble in Ranelagh' is a term used by Irish journalists to describe an open argument that took place between candidates Michael McDowell and John Gormley in Ranelagh, while canvassing in the 2007 general election. Gormley twice defeated McDowell to take the last seat, in 1997 and again in 2007, both times by relatively small margins. The 1997 result led to a mammoth recount, the longest in Irish political history, before McDowell conceded defeat.

TDs

Elections

2011 general election

2007 general election

2002 general election

1997 general election

1992 general election

1989 general election

1987 general election

November 1982 general election

February 1982 general election

1981 general election

1977 general election

1973 general election

1969 general election

1965 general election

1961 general election

1957 general election

1954 general election

1951 general election
Unusually all third seats were filled on the first count on this occasion.

Subsequent counts occurred because there was the possibility that surplus votes of elected candidates could have resulted in another candidate reaching the threshold of a third of a quota which would have meant their election deposit was returned to them.

1948 general election

See also
Politics of the Republic of Ireland
Historic Dáil constituencies
Elections in the Republic of Ireland

References

External links
Oireachtas Members Database
'A history of Dublin south east constituency' 
Dublin Historic Maps: Parliamentary & Dail Constituencies 1780–1969 (a work in progress)
Dublin Historic Maps: Some Dublin and Kingstown Wards, Between 1780 and 1954

Dáil constituencies in County Dublin (historic)
1948 establishments in Ireland
Constituencies established in 1948
2016 disestablishments in Ireland
Constituencies disestablished in 2016